Percival Harry Merriman (11 June 1882 – 1966) was an English musician and songwriter.

During World War I, he served in the 60th Division, Civil Service Rifles. While convalescing, in 1917, he became a member of The Roosters Concert Party, named after Captain G U B Roose, the Commandant of their base in Salonika, Summerhill Camp. They turned professional, made their first radio broadcast in 1923, and operated for another two decades. For them, he wrote sketches and songs, the latter including "Old Comrades Re-Union" (1930).

He appeared as a castaway on the BBC Radio programme Desert Island Discs on 17 August 1964.

His son Eric Merriman was a comedy scriptwriter, writing Beyond Our Ken for Kenneth Horne and Kenneth Williams.

References 

1882 births
1966 deaths
Date of death missing
British Army personnel of World War I
British songwriters
20th-century British musicians
People from St Pancras, London